Fabrice Landreau (born August 1, 1968 in Angoulême), is a French rugby union player.

Playing career

Club

Fabrice Landreau began playing Rugby at SC Angoulême, and then move to FC Grenoble. After several injuries, he moved to Neath RFC, and one year later Bristol Rugby. He then played for Stade Français which he won the Top 14 in 2000.

International
He earned his first cap for the France national team on November 4, 2000, against Australia.

Coaching career
After ending his playing career, he joined Fabien Galthié for Coaching Forwards.

Honours 
 French rugby champion, 2012 with FC Grenoble (Head Coach)
 French rugby champion, 2007 with Stade Français (Forwards)
 French rugby champion, 2000 with Stade Français
 French rugby runners-up, 1993 with FC Grenoble

References

External links 
 Fabrice Landreau International Statistics

French rugby union players
France international rugby union players
1968 births
Living people
People from Angoulême
Sportspeople from Charente
Rugby union hookers